Atteva zebra is a moth of the family Attevidae. It is known only from Costa Rica and Panama.

The larvae feed on shoot tips of Simarouba amara saplings and adult trees. It is more abundant than Atteva pustulella, but may be found on the same individual tree with A. pustulella and an occasional Atteva aurea in anthropogenic rain forest habitats. It has never been found on Simarouba glauca.

External links
A review of the New World Atteva (Walker) moths (Yponomeutidae, Attevinae)
Identity of the ailanthus webworm moth (Lepidoptera, Yponomeutidae), a complex of two species: evidence from DNA barcoding, morphology and ecology

Attevidae
Moths described in 1967